A slave pen or slave jail was used to temporarily hold enslaved people until they were sold. Then, they were held after they were sold until transportation was arranged. There were also slave depots which were located along routes from the slave market to their ultimate destination.

Background
Slave pens were used for decades before the American Civil War. They held people until they were sold at slave markets. The Smithsonian magazine states that "[t]hese were sites of brutal treatment and unbearable sorrow, as callous and avaricious slave traders tore apart families, separating husbands from wives, and children from their parents."

Slave pens were important in the business of breeding African Americans for sale which occurred steadily in Virginia and Maryland. There was a "forced, continual mating of slaves for the purpose of bearing children", mating the best breeders with the strongest and biggest black "bucks". When tobacco was no longer profitable to farm, planters began growing other crops that did not require as many workers, also adding to the pool of enslaved people for slave traders.

Slave trade

Arrival

Slave traders traveled to plantations to buy enslaved people to bring to market. Slave owners also brought their workers to market where they were then held in slave pens that were located near the slave markets.

New Orleans was the largest center of slave trading. Richmond, Virginia was the second. Charleston, South Carolina was the largest center for receiving African slaves. In 1808, however, there was a law enacted that banned the import of West Indian and African slaves.

Pen
Enslaved people were placed in pens to await being sold, and they could become quite crowded on the day of each sale. In New Orleans, most sales were made between September and May. Buyers visited the slave pen and inspected enslaved people prior to the sale.

Lumpkin's Jail, the largest in the state of Virginia, was a particularly inhumane place that resulted in people dying of starvation, illness, or beating. They were so cramped that they were sometimes on top of one another. There were no toilet facilities.

Departure

People were held until their means of transportation was arranged. They were transported in groups by boat, walked to their new enslavers, or a combination of the two. They were moved in groups in a coffle. This meant that people were chained together with iron rings around their necks which were fastened with wooden or iron bars. Men on horseback herded the groups, or coffles, to their destination. They used dogs, guns and whips. Railroads brought a new, simpler means of travel that did not rely on the use of coffles. In some cases, slave traders, like Franklin and Armfield Office, had a network of slave depots that were located along their routes.

Civil War
During the Civil War, slave pens were used by the Union Army to imprison Confederate soldiers. For instance, slave pens were used in St. Louis, Missouri and Alexandria, Virginia. In Natchez, Mississippi, the Forks of the Road slave market was used by the Union soldiers to offer the formerly enslaved protection and freedom. In 2021 the site was made the Natchez National Historical Park.

Old slave pens were used for places of worship. In Lexington, Kentucky, Lewis Robard's slave jail was used as a Congregational church by African Americans. A freedmen's seminary, now Virginia Union University, was established in Lumpkin's Jail. Known as the "devil's half acre",  a founder of the seminary James B. Simmons said that it would now be "God's half acre".

They were also used for schools, which is ironic since enslaved people were not allowed to receive training to read and write. When a white person saw that the former Savannah slave market was going to be used for education and mobilization of African Americans, they said:

See also
 Slave quarters in the United States
 Slave markets in the United States
 Atlantic slave trade
 Franklin and Armfield Office

References

Further reading

External links
 A slave pen journey, National Underground Railroad Freedom Center, Cincinnati
 One-Time Slave Pen Now a Museum About the Horrors of Slavery, YouTube video
 Slave pen, Alexandria, Virginia - Library of Congress

Pre-emancipation African-American history
Slavery in the United States
Slave trade in the United States
Antebellum architecture